Charles Merwin "Trey" Grayson III (born April 18, 1972) is an American politician and attorney who is currently a member at Frost Brown Todd and a principal at CivicPoint. A former Secretary of State of the Commonwealth of Kentucky, Grayson also was a candidate in the 2010 GOP primary to replace retiring Jim Bunning, losing to Rand Paul, the Tea Party favorite for the Republicans. He later was the director of the Harvard Institute of Politics. Prior to his current position, he also served as the CEO of the Northern Kentucky Chamber of Commerce.

Early life, education, and law career
A product of the Kenton County public school system, Secretary Grayson was inducted into the Kentucky Association for Academic Competition Hall of Fame for his achievements in the Governor's Cup and other academic competitions at Dixie Heights High School. Grayson was a 1989 Governor's Scholar and later served as President of the Program's Alumni Association.

Grayson went to Harvard University, where he graduated with honors in 1994 with an A.B. in government. He then returned to Kentucky, entering a JD/MBA dual-degree program at the University of Kentucky, where he was one of the first Kentucky MBA scholars and one of the first two Bert T. Combs Scholars, the College of Law's top scholarship.

After earning both degrees in 1998, he worked as an attorney with Greenebaum Doll & McDonald and later Keating, Muething & Klekamp, where he focused on estate planning and corporate law.

Republican activism
Although a member of the Democratic Party during his collegiate years, shortly after graduating Grayson became a member of the Republican Party, citing his conservative beliefs. However, Grayson voted for Bill Clinton during the 1992 presidential election.

In 2005, he was selected for the inaugural class of the Aspen-Rodel Fellowships in Public Leadership which recognizes the nation's top young elected officials. In 2004, The Council of State Governments selected him to participate in the prestigious Toll Fellowship Program, and he was recognized at the 2004 Republican National Convention by United Leaders as a "Rising Star" in the Republican Party.

In 2004, Grayson became a member of the Senior Advisory Committee to Harvard University's Institute of Politics, serving alongside U.S. Secretary of Labor Elaine Chao and U.S. Senator Ted Kennedy. Grayson has served on a variety of advisory boards to several national, election-related organizations and the steering committee for the Campaign for the Civic Mission of Schools.

Secretary Grayson's colleagues have asked him to serve in a variety of prominent national leadership positions, including chair of the Republican Association of Secretaries of State. A former NASS Treasurer, chair of the NASS Elections committee, co-chair of the NASS Presidential Primary subcommittee,  vice-chair of the NASS committee on voter participation, and NASS representative on the Council of State Government Executive Committee, Grayson also serves on the NASS standing committee on business services and the NASS executive committee. Through these positions, Grayson has become a national authority on presidential  primary reform and election administration.

Kentucky Secretary of State
Grayson was elected Kentucky's Secretary of State in November 2003. When he was sworn into office, Grayson was the youngest Secretary of State in the nation at the age of 31. Grayson modernized the Office of the Secretary of State by bringing more services online, enhanced Kentucky's election laws through several legislative packages, and revived the civic mission of schools in Kentucky by leading the effort to restore civics education in the classroom.

During his first term, his office placed millions of images online and launched several new online services which tore down the bureaucratic red tape to start a business or to run for office.  He led a nationally recognized effort to increase the civic literacy of Kentucky's youth and helped change Kentucky's election laws, including a repeal of public financing of gubernatorial campaigns.

During his first term there was a controversy involving the State Board of Elections' purging of approximately 8,000 Kentucky voters from the Kentucky voter rolls because the voters had moved out of state. Grayson and the state board of elections were defendants in a lawsuit filed by then Kentucky Attorney General Greg Stumbo. A circuit judge ruled that the Board's actions were legal but asked Grayson to take additional steps to ensure voters would not be disenfranchised. Grayson later admitted to National Public Radio that the Office had made a technical mistake in purging some of the voters, but that the concept was important.

Grayson was re-elected as Secretary of State in November 2007 by a 14-point margin. He became one of only two Republican statewide elected constitutional officers to win a second consecutive term in modern history 

In Grayson's second term, he has launched new services that allow companies to start businesses online, reducing by several days that amount of time it takes start a business in Kentucky. He also led the effort to modernize Kentucky's business laws, making it easier to start a business in Kentucky. His office was the first government entity in Kentucky to put its spending online so that taxpayers could hold his office accountable for how their tax dollars are being spent. He also cut spending in his office by 15%.

Grayson supported a policy change made by Democratic Governor Steve Beshear that made it easier for some convicted felons to apply to have their voting rights restored.  The Secretary of State's office is part of the technical process to restore voting rights, as the governor's paperwork is filed within the office. He did not support automatic restoration of voting rights to all convicted felons.

Grayson administered the $37 million Kentucky received in Federal funds to implement the Help America Vote Act (HAVA), as well the $169,755 grant from the Federal Election Assistance for Individuals with Disabilities (EAID). These funds allowed every Kentucky county to purchase a new machine for every precinct.

2010 U.S. Senate election

On January 14, 2010, Trey Grayson filed for the 2010 US Senate GOP primary in Kentucky against Rand Paul. He lost by a 23-point margin.

Endorsements
Grayson garnered endorsements from Senator Mitch McConnell, former Vice President Dick Cheney, former presidential hopeful Rudy Giuliani, Senator Rick Santorum, Representative Hal Rogers, and several members of Kentucky's State Legislators.

In late April, Focus on the Family's founder James Dobson endorsed Grayson saying he was the only candidate with the conviction to lead Kentucky. A week later, however, claiming to have been misled by senior Republican officials about Paul's stance on abortion, Dobson rescinded his endorsement of Grayson and endorsed Paul.  Although Dobson did not claim Grayson was complicit in misleading him, two days later Paul aired commercials claiming that Grayson along with other GOP leaders "deliberately deceived one of America's leading conservatives, Dr. James Dobson." The ads were later removed.

Results
With complete, but uncertified, reports from all but one of Kentucky's 120 counties, Grayson lost the election by a 23.33% margin to Rand Paul; winning 124,710 votes compared to Paul who won 206,812 votes.

After conceding the election to Mr. Paul, Grayson said, "It's time to put all differences aside, unite behind Dr. Paul, he needs our help and I for one stand ready to serve". Grayson also downplayed the Tea Party movement support for Paul following his defeat by saying, "I think there are just so many things at work here-- it's hard to pinpoint it. I think the tea party [vs.] conservative establishment thing is a little too simplistic."

Later career
It was announced on January 7, 2011, that Grayson would resign from the office of Secretary of State to accept a position at the John F. Kennedy School of Government at Harvard University. He became the Director of the Harvard Institute of Politics. Governor Steve Beshear named Bowling Green, Kentucky Mayor Elaine Walker as Grayson's replacement. Grayson's resignation became effective January 29, 2011.

At Harvard, Grayson oversaw many nationally recognized studies of political shifts between different blocks of voters, especially millennials. He was also a frequent moderator of school panels and lectures given by many of the nation's top leaders.

In 2012, Grayson joined Gabrielle Gifford's "Gabby PAC" as co-chairman.

In April 2014, it was announced that Grayson would be resigning from Harvard University effective June 30.

On May 21, 2014, the Northern Kentucky Chamber of Commerce announced Grayson would become the president and CEO of the organization, effective July 1.

In May 2017, the Northern Kentucky Chamber of Commerce announced Grayson would be resigning as the president and CEO effective June 9.

Later that year, in September, Frost Brown Todd announced that Grayson would be joining their team as a member and a principal for CivicPoint, the firm's public affairs affiliate.

In June 2020, Grayson participated in the Transition Integrity Project, a group that considered scenarios for a contested presidential election in the fall.

References

External links
 Official Website
 Harvard University Institute of Politics biography
 

|-

1972 births
Dixie Heights High School alumni
Gatton College of Business and Economics alumni
Harvard College alumni
Kentucky lawyers
Kentucky Republicans
Living people
People from Kenton County, Kentucky
Secretaries of State of Kentucky
University of Kentucky College of Law alumni